Born Is the King is the third Christmas worship album of Christian Contemporary music composed of Christmas music led by the Hillsong Church. The album includes two original songs composed by Hillsong as well as a selection of traditional Christmas Carols featuring Darlene Zschech, Matt Crocker and other members of the Hillsong Team.

Track listing

Musicians

Lead Vocals:
Darlene Zschech
Matt Crocker
Annie Garratt
Jill McCloghry
Dave Ware
Hayley Law
Nathan Finochio

Senior Pastors of Hillsong Church:
Brian & Bobbie Houston

Critical reception
Louder Than the Music, a website dedicated to Christian music, wrote in its review Born Is the King is "eight tracks long but in those eight tracks you know Christmas is here" and gave a 4.5 stars out of 5. Ryan Barbee of American website Jesus Freak Hideout gave the album 3.5 stars out of 5, commenting "it does have something to offer this holiday season, but the downside is that it's only eight tracks long and doesn't have the classic American holiday feel." He found the band rendered the traditional songs beautifully but described original song "Born Is The King" as "the antithesis of a 'White Christmas'" as it has "a very island-tropical melody with childlike fun".

Charts

References

2011 albums
2011 Christmas albums
Hillsong Music albums
Christmas albums by Australian artists